More Songs to Learn and Sing is a compilation album by Echo & the Bunnymen. Released on 11 September 2006, it is an update to the 1985 singles collection Songs to Learn & Sing. A number of tracks have been added to cover the band's career until 2005's Siberia, and one track, "The Puppet", was removed.

Track listing
CDBonus Tracks 2001-2006DVD
"The Cutter"
"The Killing Moon"
"Seven Seas"
"Bring On the Dancing Horses"
"The Game"
"Lips Like Sugar"
"Nothing Lasts Forever"
"Rust"

Charts

References

External links
The Ultimate Echo and the Bunnymen Discography, Tab & Lyric Site

Echo & the Bunnymen video albums
Echo & the Bunnymen compilation albums
2006 greatest hits albums
Music video compilation albums
2006 video albums